A sidecar is a term for a small glass of sparkling water or seltzer served beside an espresso.The purpose of the water is to cleanse a person's palate before and after drinking an espresso shot. It is commonly associated with third-wave coffee and may be served by default alongside an order of espresso.

Additionally there is also an espresso sidecar, which refers to a shot of espresso that is served alongside a cafe latte or cappuccino. In 2016, Starbucks launched a specialty beverage at some of their locations that included a beer, with an espresso sidecar meant to be poured into the beer.

Etymology
The term likely originates from bartending culture. If a bartender overpoured, and therefore ended up with more of a drink than will fit in the special glass for that drink, it was common for them to serve the extra in a small glass beside the drink. 

Meanwhile, it has become common to call anything served beside a drink a "sidecar". For example, a bar in Chicago serves a piece of chocolate with a mixed drink and calls it a "sidecar." Similarly, when diners serve milkshakes, there will typically be a little bit leftover that doesn't fit into a glass, this extra will be served alongside the milkshake in a metal mixing cup and is called a "sidecar."

History
According to Nick Cho, professional barista and owner of Wrecking Ball Coffee in San Francisco, California, the sidecar likely originated at barista competitions in the 1990s, where it was considered hospitable to serve water and a napkin with the coffee. From there, the sidecar of water (sparkling or still) likely entered high-end third wave coffee roasteries. Using sparkling water is likely due to its popularity in Europe.

Meanwhile, the espresso sidecar likely originated in the United States.

References

Carbonated water
Coffee culture
Drinks
Espresso